Rosovice is a municipality and village in Příbram District in the Central Bohemian Region of the Czech Republic. It has about 900 inhabitants.

Administrative parts

The village of Sychrov is an administrative part of Rosovice.

Notable people
Joseph Asherman (1889–1968), Israeli gynecologist

References

Villages in Příbram District